The 1975 South Carolina Gamecocks football team represented the University of South Carolina as an independent in the 1975 NCAA Division I football season. The Gamecocks finished the season 7–5 overall, but lost the Tangerine Bowl to the Miami Redskins, 20–7.

Schedule

References

South Carolina
South Carolina Gamecocks football seasons
South Carolina Gamecocks football